John Hutcheson (1853–1940) was a Member of Parliament in New Zealand, for the  Liberal Party.

Biography

Early life
A native of Dumbarton, Scotland, where he was born in 1855, he was educated at the Dumbarton Academy, where he gained a South Kensington science and art scholarship, which qualified him for a cadetship in naval architecture at Messrs. Denny Bros.' shipbuilding yards. After about a year, Mr. Hutcheson desired a change, and embarked as an apprentice on one of Messrs. J. and A. Allan's ships. He had the usual experience of "a life on the ocean wave," visiting the East and West Indies and America, remaining a considerable time in the United States. While in Portland, Oregon, he took part in the Presidential Election contests of Hayes and Tilden. Mr. Hutcheson went to Cuba during one of the periodical uprisings, and had to submit to a blockade of some five months at Santiago.

Hutcheson arrived in New Zealand in 1880, as second mate of the barque "Isle of Erin." He subsequently spent four years as first and second mate of several other coastal vessels, including the Government steamers Stella and Hinemoa. Afterwards he was employed for ten years as rigger by Messrs. E. W. Mills and Co., and in 1894 he commenced business on his own account, a company that became HUTCHWILCO.

Political career

He was returned in the Labour and Liberal interest as senior member for Wellington City at the General Election of 1896.

He represented the City of Wellington electorate from 1896 to 3 July 1899, when he resigned. He won the subsequent by-election on 25 July 1899. He was again elected at the 1899 general election and retired at the end of the term in 1902.

References

1853 births
1940 deaths
Members of the New Zealand House of Representatives
New Zealand Liberal Party MPs
People educated at Dumbarton Academy
New Zealand MPs for Wellington electorates
Scottish emigrants to New Zealand
Wellington Harbour Board members
Wellington City Councillors
19th-century New Zealand politicians
People from Dumbarton
Politicians from Wellington City